The Kanchanjunga Express is an Express train belonging to Eastern Railway zone that runs between  and  in India. It is currently being operated with 13175/13176 train numbers on a tri-weekly basis.

Service

The 13175/Kanchanjunga Express has an average speed of 40 km/hr and covers 1359 km in 33h 55m. The 13176/Kanchanjunga Express has an average speed of 41 km/hr and covers 1359 km in 32h 55m.

Timings

 13175/Kanchanjunga Express leaves Sealdah on every Monday, Wednesday and Saturday at 6:35 and reaches Silchar at 16:30 next day.
 13176/Kanchanjunga Express leaves Silchar on every Monday, Wednesday and Friday at 10:30 and reaches Sealdah at 19:25 next day.

Route and halts 

The important halts of the train are:

WEST BENGAL
 Sealdah (Kolkata)
 Dakshineswar railway station
 
 
 Ahmadpur Junction railway station
 
 Rampurhat Junction
 Murarai railway station
 
 
 Samsi railway station
 Dalkhola railway station
 Aluabari Road Junction railway station
 New Jalpaiguri (Siliguri)
 Dhupguri railway station
 Falakata Railway Station
 
 
 Kamakhyaguri

JHARKHAND
 Pakur railway station

BIHAR
 Barsoi Junction railway station
 

ASSAM
 Gossaigaon Hat Railway Station
 Fakiragram Junction railway station
 Kokrajhar railway station

Coach composition

The train has standard ICF rakes with a max speed of 110 kmph. The train consists of 19 coaches:

 1 AC II Tier
 5 AC III Tier
 8 Sleeper coaches
 4 General Unreserved
 2 Seating cum Luggage Rake

Traction

Sealdah Silchar Kanchanjunga Express is hauled by WAP-7 or WAP-4 Locomotive of Electric Loco Shed, Howrah- from  till .

Rake sharing

The train shares its rake with 13173/13174 Sealdah–Agartala Kanchenjunga Express.

Direction reversal

The train reverses its direction 2 times:

See also 

 Agartala railway station
 Silchar railway station
 Sealdah–Agartala Kanchenjunga Express
 Kanchenjunga Express

Other trains on the Kolkata–New Jalpaiguri sector
 12041/42 New Jalpaiguri–Howrah Shatabdi Express
 22309/10 Howrah–New Jalpaiguri AC Express
 12377/78 Padatik Express
 12343/44 Darjeeling Mail
 15959/60 Kamrup Express
 13175/76 Kanchanjungha Express/Sealdah–Silchar Kanchanjunga Express
 12345/46 Saraighat Express
 15721/22 New Jalpaiguri–Digha Express
 12517/18 Kolkata–Guwahati Garib Rath Express
 12525/26 Dibrugarh–Kolkata Superfast Express
 13141/42 Teesta Torsha Express
 13147/48 Uttar Banga Express
 12503/04 Bangalore Cantonment–Agartala Humsafar Express
 13181/82 Kolkata–Silghat Town Kaziranga Express 
 22511/12 Lokmanya Tilak Terminus–Kamakhya Karmabhoomi Express
 15643/44 Puri–Kamakhya Weekly Express (via Howrah)
 12363/64 Kolkata–Haldibari Intercity Express
 12509/10 Guwahati–Bengaluru Cantt. Superfast Express
 12507/08 Thiruvananthapuram–Silchar Superfast Express
 12513/14 Guwahati–Secunderabad Express

Notes

References

External links 

 25657/Kanchanjunga Express India Rail Info
 25658/Kanchanjunga Express India Rail Info

Transport in Kolkata
Transport in Silchar
Express trains in India
Rail transport in West Bengal
Rail transport in Jharkhand
Rail transport in Bihar
Rail transport in Assam
Railway services introduced in 2016
Named passenger trains of India